This is a complete list of works by American author Margaret Astrid Lindholm Ogden, who writes under the pen names Megan Lindholm and Robin Hobb.

Writing as Megan Lindholm

Novels

Short fiction

Writing as Robin Hobb

Novels

Short fiction

Non-fiction

Notes

References

Works cited

External links
 

Bibliographies by writer
Bibliographies of American writers
Fantasy bibliographies